Colban, Earl of Fife (b.  1247–1253, d. 1270/2) was ruler of Fife in Scotland. The son of Earl Malcolm and his wife Elen ferch Llywelyn, he succeeded his father while still a teenager on Malcolm's death in 1266. He had been knighted by King Alexander III in 1264.

His wife's name was Anna, and she was likely one of the three daughters and coheiresses of Sir Alan Durward. Colban and Anna had a son, Duncan, who succeeded as Earl of Fife at the age of eight, and a daughter, Marjory, who married Alan, Earl of Menteith. Colban died while still a young man. His date of death is disputed, and depends on what evidence one interprets. G.W.S. Barrow gives 1272, but Bannerman gives 1270.

References

Bibliography
 Grant, Rev'd Alexander, "The Ancient Earls of Fife", in Sir James Balfour Paul (ed.) The Scots Peerage, Volume IV, (Edinburgh, 1907), pp. 10–11
 Bannerman, John, "MacDuff of Fife," in A. Grant & K.Stringer (eds.) Medieval Scotland: Crown, Lordship and Community, Essays Presented to G.W.S. Barrow,  (Edinburgh, 1993), pp. 20–38
 Barrow, G. W. S., The Kingdom of the Scots: Government, Church and Society from the Eleventh to the Fourteenth Century, (Edinburgh, 2003)
 Ravilious, J., "The Earls of Menteith: Murdoch, Earl of Menteith and the Ferrers family of Groby", The Scottish Genealogist (March 2013), Vol. LX, No. 1, pp. 12–25.
 Hammond, Matthew, "Hostiarii Regis Scotie: the Durward family in the thirteenth century," in Steve Boardman and Alasdair Ross, eds., The Exercise of Power in Medieval Scotland, c. 1200-1500 (Dublin: Four Courts Press, 2003), pp. 118–138

1270s deaths
Colban
People from Fife
Year of birth unknown
Mormaers of Fife
13th-century mormaers
Year of birth uncertain